Black Mask was a pulp magazine first published in April 1920 by the journalist H. L. Mencken and the drama critic George Jean Nathan. The magazine was one of several money-making publishing ventures to support the prestigious literary magazine The Smart Set, which Mencken edited, and which had operated at a loss since at least 1917. Under their editorial hand, the magazine was not exclusively a publisher of crime fiction, offering, according to the magazine, "the best stories available of adventure, the best mystery and detective stories, the best romances, the best love stories, and the best stories of the occult." The magazine's first editor was Florence Osborne (credited as F. M. Osborne).

Editorial control 
After eight issues, Mencken and Nathan considered their initial $600 investment to have been sufficiently profitable, and they sold the magazine to its publishers, Eltinge Warner and Eugene Crow, for $12,500. The magazine was then edited by George W. Sutton (1922–24), followed by Philip C. Cody. Cody had significant interests and expertise in the publishing world serving as Vice President of Warner Publications publishers of such mass market magazines as Field and Stream, and pulp genre publications such as Black Mask. Under Cody's editorship, the content of Black Mask became more sensationalist. Cody, who had a keen sense for what appealed to the public marketplace, focused on what had the most reader allure. Under Cody, the stories chosen for publication were longer, more intricately plotted and strewn with more blood, guts, gore and sex. Cody served as both circulation editor and general editor from 1924 to 1926. In 1926, Joseph Shaw took over the editorship.

Contributing authors
Early Black Mask contributors of note included J. S. Fletcher, Vincent Starrett, and Herman Petersen. Shaw, following up on a promising lead from one of the early issues, promptly turned the magazine into an outlet for the growing school of naturalistic crime writers led by Carroll John Daly. Daly's private detective Race Williams was a rough-and-ready character with a sharp tongue, establishing a model for many later acerbic private eyes.

Black Mask later published stories by the profoundly influential Dashiell Hammett, creator of Sam Spade and The Continental Op, and other hardboiled writers who came in his wake, such as Raymond Chandler, Erle Stanley Gardner, Paul Cain, Frederick Nebel, Frederick C. Davis, Raoul F. Whitfield, Theodore Tinsley, Todhunter Ballard (as W.T. Ballard), Dwight V. Babcock, and Roger Torrey. The best-known contributors to Black Mask were mostly men, but the magazine also published works by many female crime writers, including Marjory Stoneman Douglas, Katherine Brocklebank, Sally Dixon Wright, Florence M. Pettee, Marion O'Hearn, Kay Krausse, Frances Beck, Tiah Devitt and Dorothy Dunn. Crime fiction made up most of the magazine's content, but Black Mask also published some Western and general adventure fiction.

The magazine was successful, and many of the writers whose work appeared in its pages, such as Hugh B. Cave, went on to greater commercial and critical success. Writer George Harmon Coxe created "Casey, Crime Photographer", for the magazine; the character became a media franchise, appearing in novels, films, radio and television programs, comic books, and theatrical productions.

Black Mask's covers were usually painted by Fred Craft or J. W. Schlaikjer. Shaw gave Arthur Rodman Bowker a monopoly on creating illustrations for the interior of the magazine.

Decline and revival
Black Mask reached a sales peak in the early 1930s, but then interest began to wane under increasing pressure from radio, the cinema, and rival pulp magazines. In 1936, refusing to cut writers' already meager pay, Shaw resigned, and many of the high-profile authors abandoned the magazine with him. Shaw's successor, Fanny Ellsworth (1936–40), managed to attract new writers to Black Mask, including Cornell Woolrich, Frank Gruber, Max Brand and Steve Fisher. However, from the 1940s on, Black Mask was in decline, despite the efforts of a new editor, Kenneth S. White (1940–48). The magazine in this period carried the work of John D. MacDonald. Henry Steeger then edited Black Mask anonymously until it ceased publication in 1951.

In 1985, the magazine was revived as The New Black Mask, featuring noted crime writers James Ellroy,
Michael Collins, Sara Paretsky and Bill Pronzini, as well as Chandler and Hammett reprints. Edward D. Hoch praised the revived Black Mask, stating in the book Encyclopedia Mysteriosa that "it came close to reviving the excitement and storytelling pleasure of the great old pulp magazines". As a result of a legal dispute over the rights to the name Black Mask, the magazine ceased publication in 1987. It was revived as a short-lived magazine entitled A Matter of Crime.

Original copies of the Black Mask are highly valued among pulp magazine collectors. Issues with stories by Chandler and Hammett are especially rare and command high prices.

In 2016, the magazine, including its copyrights and intellectual property, were acquired by Steeger Properties, LLC. It was relaunched by Altus Press.

Select covers from Black Mask were featured as collectable items in the 2020 action-adventure video game Mafia: Definitive Edition.

Anthologies
 
 
  Includes a short history of the magazine.

References

External links
 
 
 

 
Bimonthly magazines published in the United States
Monthly magazines published in the United States
Defunct literary magazines published in the United States
Magazines established in 1920
Magazines disestablished in 1987
Pulp magazines